Diamonds and Pearls is a 1917 American silent drama film directed by George Archainbaud and starring Kitty Gordon, Milton Sills, and George MacQuarrie.

Cast

References

Bibliography

External links
 

1917 films
1917 drama films
1910s English-language films
American silent feature films
Silent American drama films
Films directed by George Archainbaud
American black-and-white films
World Film Company films
Films shot in Fort Lee, New Jersey
1910s American films